

Events
 Adam de Givenchi named as a priest and chaplain to the Bishop of Arras

Births
 Lu Zhi (died 1315), Chinese writer and poet of the Yuan dynasty
 Roger-Bernard III of Foix (died 1302), the Count of Foix, poet and troubadour

Deaths

13th-century poetry
Poetry